General elections were held in Montserrat in 1966. The result was a victory for the Montserrat Labour Party, which won five of the seven seats in the Legislative Council. MLP leader William Henry Bramble remained Chief Minister.

Campaign
A total of 20 candidates contested the elections; the MLP had a full slate of seven candidates, the Montserrat Workers' Progressive Party nominated five, with the remaining eight running as independents.

Results

Elected MPs

References

Elections in Montserrat
Montserrat
1966 in Montserrat